Ivan Allardyce (15 April 1895 – 14 November 1967) was a New Zealand cricketer. He played in four first-class matches for Canterbury and Wellington between 1917 and 1919.

References

External links
 

1895 births
1967 deaths
New Zealand cricketers
Canterbury cricketers
Wellington cricketers
Cricketers from Christchurch